Mimulopsis is a genus in the flowering plant family Acanthaceae with about 30 species native to tropical Africa and Madagascar.

Selected species
Some species of Mimulopsis:
 Mimulopsis affinis Baker	
 Mimulopsis alpina Chiov.
 Mimulopsis angustata Benoist
 Mimulopsis arborescens C.B.Clarke
 Mimulopsis armata Benoist
 Mimulopsis bagshawei S.Moore
 Mimulopsis catatii Benoist
 Mimulopsis dasyphylla Mildbr.
 Mimulopsis diffusa Baker
 Mimulopsis elliotii C.B.Clarke
 Mimulopsis excellens Lindau
 Mimulopsis forsythii S. Moore
 Mimulopsis glandulosa Baker
 Mimulopsis hildebrandtii Lindau	
 Mimulopsis kilimandscharica Lindau
 Mimulopsis lanceolata Baker
 Mimulopsis longisepala Mildbr.
 Mimulopsis lyalliana (Nees) Baron
 Mimulopsis madagascariensis (Baker) Benoist
 Mimulopsis runssorica Lindau
 Mimulopsis schliebenii Mildbr.
 Mimulopsis sesamoides S.Moore
 Mimulopsis solmsii Schweinf.
 Mimulopsis spathulata C.B.Clarke
 Mimulopsis speciosa Baker
 Mimulopsis thomsonii C.B.Clarke
 Mimulopsis usumburensis Lindau
 Mimulopsis velutinella Mildbr.
 Mimulopsis violacea Lindau

References

External links

Acanthaceae
Flora of Madagascar
Flora of Africa
Acanthaceae genera